Makoto Odakura (小田倉 真, born 20 July 1993) is a Japanese triathlete. He competed in the men's event at the 2020 Summer Olympics held in Tokyo, Japan. He also competed in the mixed relay event.

References

External links
 

1993 births
Living people
Japanese male triathletes
Olympic triathletes of Japan
Triathletes at the 2020 Summer Olympics
Sportspeople from Tokyo
Triathletes at the 2018 Asian Games
21st-century Japanese people